The Swedenborgian Church in North America (also known as the General Convention of the Church of the New Jerusalem) is one of a few Christian sects that draws its faith from the Bible as illuminated by the teachings of Emanuel Swedenborg (1688–1772). The Administrative Offices of the denomination are located at 50 Quincy St., Cambridge, Massachusetts.

Beliefs

The church believes that the writings of Swedenborg expand upon a deeper understanding of the Christian bible. This new understanding began the second coming of Christ which is continually being manifested in spirit and truth rather than a physical appearance. The Swedenborgian Church of North America does not make any statements as to the exact authority of Swedenborg's writings on the Bible or to the correctness of either. Each Society and member is given the responsibility to arrive at their own conclusions, and the denomination allows for discussion and debate. It is also liberal on social issues and sexual ethics, such as the ordination of women, homosexuality, and abortion.

Structure
The Swedenborgian Church has a congregational form of governance. Local churches, often called societies, form regional associations and those associations send delegates to an annual convention. The Center for Swedenborgian Studies operates as the denomination's theological training institution and seminary. The center is located at Graduate Theological Union in Berkeley, California. The church also operates an online church called Swedenborgian Community Online which provides weekly resources on its website and social media. In 2003, the Swedenborgian Church of North America had about 1,800 members, almost identical to the membership it had in 1981 but rather less than the 5,440 it had in 1925.

Affiliations
The Swedenborgian Church in North America is one of the Four Church Organizations that comprise The New Church.  It is a member of the National Council of Churches USA.

See also
Church of the Open Word (Newtonville)
Swedenborg Chapel
Swedenborgianism

References

External links
Swedenborgian Church of North America (Official Website)
Center for Swedenborgian Studies (Seminary)
Swedenborgian Community Online (Online church)
New Church in New Zealand (Official Website)
Christian teachings of the New Church
New Christian Bible Study 
Swedenborgian Church of North America (Association of Religious Data Archives)

 
Religious organizations based in Boston
Swedenborgian denominations
Members of the National Council of Churches
Religious organizations established in 1817
1817 establishments in the United States